Chhattisgarh Legislative Assembly election 2013 was held in two phases on 11 and 19 November in Chhattisgarh state of India. The result was announced on 8 December. Incumbent ruling party BJP and Chief Minister Raman Singh retained the majority in assembly and formed government consequently for the third time.

Polls
Voter-verified paper audit trail (VVPAT) along with EVMs was used in 1 assembly seat in Chhattisgarh elections. The first phase in the Naxal-affected areas of Bastar, consisting 18 constituencies, voted on 11 November and had a 75.53% voter turnout. The second phase in the other 72 constituencies was held on 19 November and had a 74.7% turnout.

Security
The Hindu reported that 32 battalions of central paramilitaries were added to the 117,000 security force personnel in the area. Another almost 25,000 Chhattisgarh Police were stations in south Chhattisgarh. As a result, the Gond tribal region would consist of approximately 143,000 armed security personnel. The Hindu stated that after the mobilization of 600 companies of paramilitary forces in the tribal region, it was "one of the most militarized zones in the world."

Results
Results were declared on 8 December 2013. Bharatiya Janata Party won 49 seats while the Indian National Congress won 39 seats. One
Independent and one Bahujan Samaj Party candidate also won. BJP retained majority in state legislative assembly for consequently third time and Raman Singh sworn in as a Chief Minister.

!colspan=10|
|-
! colspan="2" rowspan="2" |Parties and coalitions
! colspan="3" |Popular vote
! colspan="4" |Seats
|- style="background-color:#E9E9E9;"
! Votes !! % !! ± pp
!Contested!! Won !! +/− 
! %
|- style="text-align:right"
| 
| style="text-align:left;" |Bharatiya Janata Party (BJP)||5,365,272||41.0||0.7
|90||49|| 1 ||54.44
|- style="text-align:right"
| 
| style="text-align:left;" |Indian National Congress (INC)||5,267,698||40.3||1.7
|90||39|| 1 ||43.33
|- style="text-align:right"
| 
| style="text-align:left;" |Independents (IND)
|697,267
|5.3
|3.2
|355
|1
|1
|1.11
|- style="text-align:right"
| 
| style="text-align:left;" |Bahujan Samaj Party (BSP)
|558,424
|4.3
|1.8
|90
|1
|1
|1.11
|- style="text-align:right"
|
| style="text-align:left;" |Chhattisgarh Swabhiman Manch (CSM)
|226,167
|1.7
|1.7
|54
|0
|
|0.00
|- style="text-align:right"
|
| style="text-align:left;" |Gondvana Gantantra Party (GGP)
|205,325
|1.6
|
|44
|0
|
|0.00
|- style="text-align:right"
|
| style="text-align:left;" |Other parties and candidates||352,622||2.7
|2.2
|353||0
|  ||0.00
|- style="text-align:right"
|
| style="text-align:left;" |None of the Above (NOTA)
|401,058
|3.1
|3.1
| colspan="4" style="background-color:#E9E9E9" |
|-
! colspan="9" |
|- style="font-weight:bold; text-align:right"
| colspan="2" style="text-align:left;" | Total
|13,073,833
| 100.00 || style="background-color:#E9E9E9" |
|1076
| 90 || ±0 || 100.0
|-
! colspan="9" |
|- style="text-align:right"
| colspan="2" style="text-align:left; " |Valid votes
|12,672,775
|99.90
|
| colspan="4" rowspan="5" style="background-color:#E9E9E9" |
|-style="text-align:right"
| colspan="2" style="text-align:left; " |Invalid votes
|12,051
|0.10
|
|-style="text-align:right"
| colspan="2" style="text-align:left; " |Votes cast / turnout
|13,085,884
|77.45
|
|-style="text-align:right"
| colspan="2" style="text-align:left; " |Abstentions
|4,222,987
|22.55
|
|-style="text-align:right"
| colspan="2" style="text-align:left; " |Registered voters
|16,895,762
| colspan="2" style="background-color:#E9E9E9" |
|-
! colspan="9" |
|-style="text-align:right"
| colspan="9" style="text-align:left; " |Source: Election Commission of India
|-
|}

Elected members

Cabinet ministers
Raman Singh: Chief Minister
Ajay Chandrakar: Panchayat and Rural Development, Culture, Tourism, and Parliamentary Affairs
Amar Agrawal:  Public Health and Family Welfare, Medical Education, commercial tax and labor
Brijmohan Agrawal: Agriculture, Animal Husbandry, Fisheries and Water Resources, Ayacut, religious trusts and charitable
Kedarnath Kashyap: Tribal and Scheduled Caste Development, Backward Classes and Minorities Development, School of Education
Prem Prakash Pandey:  Revenue and Disaster Management, Rehabilitation, Higher Education, Technical Education, and Manpower Planning, Science & Technology
Rajesh Munat: Public Works Department, Transport, Housing & Environment.
Ramshila Sahu: Women & Child Development

See also
 2013 elections in India
2008 Chhattisgarh Legislative Assembly election

References

External links
 
 

2013 State Assembly elections in India
State Assembly elections in Chhattisgarh
2010s in Chhattisgarh